Runge is a lunar impact crater in the Mare Smythii, along the eastern edge of the Moon. It lies less than one crater diameter to the north-northwest of the very similar crater Warner. To the west-northwest is Haldane. Runge has been almost completely submerged by basaltic lava, leaving only a low, ring-shaped feature in the lunar mare. The rim has a gap at the southern end, and a pair of small craters lie near the exterior to either side of this opening.

References

 
 
 
 
 
 
 
 
 
 
 
 

Impact craters on the Moon